Mohamed Mahfood Sayed (born 27 April 1960) represented South Yemen in the boxing, competing at the 1988 Summer Olympic Games in the flyweight event, after a first round bye, he was knocked-out in the second minute of his second round bout.

References

External links
 

Boxers at the 1988 Summer Olympics
1960 births
Living people
Yemeni male boxers
Olympic boxers of South Yemen
Flyweight boxers